Jeannot Gilbert (born December 29, 1940) is a Canadian former professional ice hockey forward who played 9 games in the National Hockey League for the Boston Bruins between 1963 and 1965. He also played 133 games in the World Hockey Association with the Quebec Nordiques between 1973 and 1975. The rest of his career, which lasted from 1960 to 1975, was mainly spent in the American Hockey League.

Playing career
Gilbert played junior with the Barrie Flyers and Niagara Falls Flyers of the Ontario Hockey Association from 1959 to 1961. He made his professional debut during the 1960–61 season, playing one game with the Kingston Frontenacs of the Eastern Professional Hockey League. He spent the next two seasons with Kingston, though most of the 1961–62 season was spent with the Clinton Comets of the Eastern Hockey League. On March 14, 1963 Gilbert made his NHL debut with the Boston Bruins, playing against the Chicago Black Hawks. He played five games with the Bruins that season. Gilbert then played one season, 1963–64 season with the Minneapolis Bruins of the Central Professional Hockey League. 

He played a further four games for Boston in 1964–65, but the bulk of the season was spent with their American Hockey League (AHL) affiliate the Providence Reds. He moved to the Hershey Bears of the AHL in 1965, and played eight seasons there. In the 1967 NHL Expansion Draft Gilbert was selected by the Pittsburgh Penguins, but never played for them. In 1973 he joined the Quebec Nordiques of the World Hockey Association, and played two seasons there before retiring in 1975.

Career statistics

Regular season and playoffs

External links
 

1940 births
Living people
Barrie Flyers players
Boston Bruins players
Canadian expatriate ice hockey players in the United States
Canadian ice hockey centres
Clinton Comets players
French Quebecers
Hershey Bears players
Ice hockey people from Quebec
Kingston Frontenacs (EPHL) players
Minneapolis Bruins players
Niagara Falls Flyers players
Providence Reds players
Quebec Nordiques (WHA) players
Sportspeople from Saguenay, Quebec